Anywhere for You may refer to:

"Anywhere for You" (Backstreet Boys song), 1997
"Anywhere for You" (John Martin song), 2014